Nowa Sucha  is a village in Sochaczew County, Masovian Voivodeship, in east-central Poland. It is the seat of the gmina (administrative district) called Gmina Nowa Sucha.

References

Nowa Sucha